The monkey (猴) is the ninth of the 12-year cycle of animals which appear in the Chinese zodiac related to the Chinese calendar. The year of the monkey is associated with the Earthly Branch symbol 申.

Years and the five elements

People born within these date ranges can be said to have been born in the "year of the monkey", while bearing the following elemental sign:

Basic astrology elements

References

Further reading

External links

Chinese astrological signs
Vietnamese astrological signs
Mythological monkeys
de:Chinesische Astrologie#Zählung ab Jahresbeginn